The black-winged stilt (Himantopus himantopus) is a widely distributed very long-legged wader in the avocet and stilt family (Recurvirostridae). The scientific name H. himantopus is sometimes applied to a single, almost cosmopolitan species. Alternatively, it is restricted to the form that is widespread in Europe, Asia and Africa, which equals the nominate group of Himantopus himantopus sensu lato (whereas the black-necked, H. mexicanus, and white-backed stilt, H. melanurus, both inhabit the Americas, and the pied stilt, H. leucocephalus, inhabit southeast Asia to Australia and New Zealand). Most sources today accept 1–4 species. The scientific name Himantopus comes from the Greek meaning "strap foot" or "thong foot".

Description

They have long pink legs, a long thin black bill and are blackish above and white below, with a white head and neck with a varying amount of black. Males have a black back, often with greenish gloss. Females' backs have a brown hue, contrasting with the black remiges. In the populations that have the top of the head normally white at least in winter, females tend to have less black on head and neck all year round, while males often have much black, particularly in summer. This difference is not clear-cut, however, and males usually get all-white heads in winter.

Immature birds are grey instead of black and have a markedly sandy hue on the wings, with light feather fringes appearing as a whitish line in flight.

Taxonomy and systematics
The taxonomy of this bird is still somewhat contentious. It is one of four distinct species which sometimes are considered subspecies of H. himantopus.  H. himantopus sensu lato, is made up of one species and 5–7 subspecies, and is sometimes referred to as common stilt. The name black-winged stilt refers to H. himantopus sensu stricto, with two subspecies H.h. himantopus from the Palearctic and southern Asia, and H.h. meridionalis from the Afrotropical region.

Ecology and status
The breeding habitat of all these stilts is marshes, shallow lakes and ponds. Some populations are migratory and move to the ocean coasts in winter; those in warmer regions are generally resident or short-range vagrants. In Europe, the black-winged stilt is a regular spring overshoot vagrant north of its normal range, occasionally remaining to breed in northern European countries. Pairs successfully bred in Britain in 1987, and after a 27-year hiatus there were two instances of successful breeding in Southern England in 2014. 13 young were fledged in southern England in 2017. Four chicks were successfully fledged in northern England in 2022; this is believed to be the most northerly breeding success for the black-winged stilt.

These birds pick up their food from sand or water. They eat mainly insects and crustaceans.

The nest site is a bare spot on the ground near water. These birds often nest in small groups, sometimes with avocets.

The black-winged stilt is one of the species to which the Agreement on the Conservation of African-Eurasian Migratory Waterbirds applies.

References

Further reading

External links

 
 Black-winged Stilt species text in The Atlas of Southern African Birds.
 Ageing and sexing (PDF; 2.7 MB) by Javier Blasco-Zumeta & Gerd-Michael Heinze
 
 
 
 

black-winged stilt
Cosmopolitan birds
black-winged stilt
black-winged stilt
Holarctic birds